Roh Gap-taik (born 3 May 1964) is a Korean former professional tennis player.

Born in Gyeonggi-do, Roh appeared in a total of five Davis Cup ties for South Korea and was a member of the gold medal winning Korean team at the 1986 Asian Games. In his Davis Cup career, between 1985 and 1988, he played in eight singles rubbers and was only beaten once.

Roh, a right-handed player, twice received a wildcard into the main draw of the Korea Open in Seoul, which were his only ATP Tour appearances. He won a Challenger title in Guangzhou in 1988, despite qualifying for the event as a lucky loser.

Since retiring he has had multiple stints serving as South Korea's Davis Cup captain.

Challenger titles

Singles: (1)

See also
List of South Korea Davis Cup team representatives

References

External links
 
 
 

1964 births
Living people
South Korean male tennis players
Sportspeople from Gyeonggi Province
Asian Games gold medalists for South Korea
Asian Games medalists in tennis
Tennis players at the 1986 Asian Games
Medalists at the 1986 Asian Games
Tennis players at the 1984 Summer Olympics
Olympic tennis players of South Korea
Medalists at the 1987 Summer Universiade
Universiade bronze medalists for South Korea
Universiade medalists in tennis
20th-century South Korean people